Prosperity is an unincorporated community in Lafayette Township, Madison County, Indiana.

History
Prosperity was founded around the time the canal was extended to that point. A post office was established at Prosperity in 1853, and remained in operation until it was discontinued in 1875.

The town of Prosperity appeared on the hit TV show 'Supernatural' season 7, episode 5.

Geography

References 

Unincorporated communities in Madison County, Indiana
Unincorporated communities in Indiana
Indianapolis metropolitan area